Catuabines are a group of tropane alkaloids, isolated from Erythroxylum vaccinifolium, which are used in the preparation of the drug Catuaba (which in traditional Brazilian medicine is purported to be an aphrodisiac and central nervous system stimulant, though such claims have not been substantiated). While catuabine A, B and C were isolated and characterized by Graf and Lude (1977, 1978), catuabine D was recently isolated by Zanolari et al. The catuabines are not known to have any physiological effects, this is in contrast to cocaine, which is an active constituent of another species, Erythroxylum coca.

See also 
Hygrine
Cuscohygrine

References 
 Glasl, S.; Presser, A.; Werner, I.; Haslinger, E.; Jurenitsch, J. (2003): Tropane alkaloids from a Brazilian bark traded as "Catuaba". Scientia Pharmaceutica Vol. 71: 113-119. (CODEN SCPHA4). 
 Glasl, S.; Presser, A.; Werner, I.; Haslinger, E.; Jurenitsch, J. (2004): Erratum to Tropane alkaloids from a Brazilian bark traded as "Catuaba". Scientia Pharmaceutica Vol. 72: 97. (CODEN SCPHA4). 
 Graf, E.; Lude, W (1977): Alkaloids from Erythroxylum vacciniifolium Martius, 1. pt. Isolation of catuabine A, B and C. Archiv der Pharmazie (Weinheim) Vol. 310(12): 1005-1010. (CODEN ARPMAS).
 Graf, E.; Lude, W. (1978): Alkaloids from Erythroxylum vacciniifolium Martius, 2. pt. The structures of catuabine A, B and C. Archiv der Pharmazie (Weinheim) Vol. 311(2): 139-152. (CODEN ARPMAS).
 Zanolari, B.; Wolfeneder, J.L.; Guilet, D.; Marston, A.; Queiroz, E.F.; Paulo, M.Q.; Hostettmann, K. (2003): On-line identification of tropane alkaloids from Erythroxylum vacciniifolium by liquid chromatography-UV detection-multiple mass spectrometry and liquid chromatography-nuclear magnetic resonance spectrometry. Journal of Chromatogragraphy Vol. 1020A: 75-89. (CODEN JCRAEY).
 Zanolari, B.; Guilet, D.; Marston, A.; Queiroz, E.F.; de Queiroz Paulo, M.; Hostettmann, K. (2003): Tropane alkaloids from the bark of Erythroxylum vacciniifolium. Journal of Natural Products Vol. 66(4): 497-502. (CODEN JNPRDF).
 Zanolari, B.; Guilet, D.; Marston, A.; Queiroz, E.F.; de Queiroz Paulo, M.; Hostettmann, K. (2005): Methylpyrrole tropane alkaloids from the bark of Erythroxylum vacciniifolium. Journal of Natural Products Vol. 68(8): 1153-1158. (CODEN JNPRDF).

Tropane alkaloids
Alkaloids found in Erythroxylum